Lake Oliver is a natural lake in South Dakota, in the United States.

Lake Oliver has the name of Henry Oliver, an early landholder.

See also
List of lakes in South Dakota

References

Lakes of South Dakota
Lakes of Deuel County, South Dakota